Eupithecia oppidana is a moth in the family Geometridae. It is found in South America.

References
This article relating to the superfamily Geometroidea is a stub. You can help Wikipedia by expanding it.

Moths described in 1994
oppidana
Moths of South America